The 2009–10 Georgian Cup (also known as the David Kipiani Cup) was the 66th season overall and twentieth since independence of the Georgian annual football tournament. The competition began on 25 August 2009 and ended with the Final on 26 May 2010. The defending champions were Dinamo Tbilisi.

Round of 32
These matches were played on 25 and 26 August and 16 September 2009.

|}

Round of 16
In this round entered 12 winners from the previous round as well as four teams that finished first, second, third and fourth in last year's Umaglesi Liga: WIT Georgia, Dinamo Tbilisi, Olimpi Rustavi and Zestafoni. The matches were played on 21 October 2009.

|}

Quarterfinals
The eight winners from the previous round play in this round. The first legs were played on 3 November 2009 and the second legs were played on 1 and 2 December 2009.

|}

Semifinals
The four winners from the previous round played in this round. The first legs were played on 23 March 2010 and the second legs were played on 14 April 2010.

|}

Final

See also 
 2009–10 Umaglesi Liga
 2009–10 Pirveli Liga

External links
 Official site 
 goli.ge 
 es.geofootball.com  

Georgian Cup seasons
Cup
Georgian Cup